Scott Michael Bradfield (born 27 April 1955) is an American essayist, critic and fiction writer who resides in London, England. He has taught at the University of California, the University of Connecticut and Kingston University and has reviewed for The Times Literary Supplement, Elle, The Observer, Vice and The Independent. He is best known, however, for his short stories, of which he has had four collections published. The 1998 film Luminous Motion, for which he wrote the screenplay, was based on his first novel, The History of Luminous Motion (1989). Bradfield also operates a public youtube channel, where he uploads videos on a variety of books and literary topics.

Bradfield currently teaches at St. Mary's University and City Literary Institute.

Bibliography

Novels
 
 
 Animal Planet New York: Picador USA, 1995. 
 Good Girl Wants It Bad New York: Carroll & Graf, 2004. 
 The People Who Watched Her Pass By Columbus, Ohio: Two Dollar Radio, 2010. 
 
 Dazzle Resplendent: Adventures of a Misanthropic Dog: 2016,

Short fiction 
Collections
 The Secret Life of Houses London: Unwin Hyman, 1989. 
 Dream of the Wolf New York: Knopf, 1990. 
 Greetings from Earth: New and Collected Stories New York: Picador USA, 1996. 
 Hot Animal Love: Tales of Modern Romance New York: Carroll & Graf, 2005. 
Stories

Criticism
 Dreaming Revolution: Transgression in the Development of American Romance. Iowa City: University Of Iowa Press, 1993. 
 Why I Hate Toni Morrison's Beloved: First presented as the Seymour Fischer Lecture at the Free University of Berlin, on January 17, 2001. It was revised and expanded and published in the Denver Quarterly and later reprinted online . Published by Createspace Independent Publishing Platform (2016):

References

External links

Enotes 'Bradfield, Scott Introduction'
Strong, Benjamin 'The Gloriously Irresponsible Career of Scott Bradfield'
Bradfield, Scott 'Why I Hate Toni Morrison's Beloved' 

1955 births
Living people
20th-century American essayists
20th-century American novelists
20th-century American short story writers
20th-century American male writers
21st-century American essayists
21st-century American novelists
21st-century American short story writers
21st-century American male writers
Academics of Kingston University
American expatriates in England
American film critics
American male essayists
American male novelists
American male short story writers
The Magazine of Fantasy & Science Fiction people
University of California, Berkeley faculty
University of Connecticut faculty
Novelists from Connecticut